Aloïse Retornaz (born 3 February 1994) is a French sailor.

Early life and education
Retornaz was born in Brest. She studied at ISEN Brest.

Life and career
Retornaz and Camille Lecointre won the 470 European Championships in 2019 and 2021. They also won the silver medal in 470 category at the 2019 Military World Games in Wuhan, and win the final of the Sailing World Cup in Marseille. Alongside Lecointre, Retornaz was awarded the 2019 Sailor of the Year award by the French Sailing Federation. Lecointre and Retornaz won the bronze medal at the 2020 Summer Olympics in the women's 470 event.

References

External links
 
 
 
 

1994 births
Living people
French female sailors (sport)
Sportspeople from Brest, France
Olympic sailors of France
Sailors at the 2020 Summer Olympics – 470
Medalists at the 2020 Summer Olympics
Olympic medalists in sailing
Olympic bronze medalists for France
21st-century French women